The Peruvian State, which is conceptually the Peruvian nation legally organized, is the entity that holds the government in the Republic of Peru. The state's structure is defined in the Constitution of Peru approved by referendum and promulgated in late 1993 and in force since January 1, 1994.

Article No. 43 
"The Republic of Peru is democratic, social, independent and sovereign." 
"The State is one and indivisible." 
"The government is unitary, representative and decentralized, and is organized according to the principle of separation of powers." 
Constitution of Peru

The Constitution states that the Republic of Peru is democratic, social, independent and sovereign. The government is unitary, representative and organized according to the principle of separation of powers is vested in a unitary state.

Structure

Central Government
It is formed by the executive, legislative, judicial branches and autonomous constitutional agencies.

Executive Branch
The Executive Branch is responsible for executing the government, enforcing laws and policies that the State promotes. It's formed by the office of the President of Peru, the Cabinet of Peru and the executive branch agencies.

The President of the Republic, who is both head of state and head of government, personifies the nation, the office of the President and Vice Presidents throughout the country.

The Cabinet of Peru, is composed by Ministers of State and chaired by the Prime Minister of Peru.

Ministries
 Ministry of Agriculture and Irrigation
 Ministry of Foreign Commerce and Tourism
 Ministry of Defense
 Ministry of Economy and Finance
 Ministry of Education
 Ministry of Energy and Mines
 Ministry of the Interior
 Ministry of Justice and Human Rights
 Ministry of Women and Vulnerable Populations
 Ministry of Production
 Ministry of Foreign Relations
 Ministry of Health
 Ministry of Labor and Promotion of Employment
 Ministry of Transportation and Communications
 Ministry of Housing, Construction and Sanitation
 Ministry of Environment
 Ministry of Culture
 Ministry of Development and Social Inclusion

Legislative Branch
The Legislative Branch is vested in the Congress of the Republic of Peru, consisting of a single chamber of 130 members elected by direct suffrage and multiple district in proportion to the population of each region (Lima Region has 32 congressmen, Madre de Dios Region have one). The Congress is renewed every five years. The start and end dates of a constitutional term are the same that apply to the presidential constitutional term.

Judicial Branch
The judicial function is performed by the judiciary, headed by the Supreme Court of Peru, which has jurisdiction over the entire territory.
It is the body responsible for administering justice. The second hierarchical level is formed by the Superior Courts with jurisdiction over an entire Judicial District.

The third level is formed by the Courts of First Instance whose competence is about provincial.

Finally, the Justices of the Peace, with district competition.

Autonomous Constitutional Agencies
The Constitution, to safeguard the rule of law and greater efficiency in the execution of some tasks, has created some autonomous agencies, which do not depend on any of the branches of government:
 National Jury of Elections
 National Office of Electoral Processes
 National Registry of Identification and Civil Status
 Constitutional Tribunal of Peru
 Public Ministry
 National Board of Justice
 Central Reserve Bank of Peru
 Comptroller General of the Republic of Peru
 Public Defender
 Superintendency of Banking and Insurance of Peru

Regional Governments
The regional level, as stated in the constitution, corresponds to the regions and departments. Currently, the country has no regions and each department is expected to join some (I) other (s) to form regions.
The administration of each region is managed by a body called the Regional Government, consisting of a regional council, a presidency regional and regional Coordinating Council. Although there is currently no region RBCs have settled at the departmental level to lead the process of regionalization.
Peru is a highly centralized country. Thus, in 2003 the central government concentrated 86% of revenue compared to 65% of the countries in the region and 54% in developed countries, public spending of subnational governments was 12% compared to total expenditure, while in the countries of Latin America is 35%, and in most developed countries is 43%. Lima accounts for about 86% of tax revenues. PAGE 24: http://idbdocs.iadb.org/wsdocs/getdocument.aspx?docnum=917346 decentralization Early efforts began in 1985, when 12 regions were created: the process was not successful due to the conflicts in the political influence and the distribution of the budget, transfer of skills disorganized, inconsistency with the tax system, and the system of choice it was for regional assemblies. In 1992 suspended the process and replaced by decentralized administration of the central government called CTAR-Transitory Councils of Regional Administration, in every department, and was accentuated centralism. In 2001, the decentralization process is revitalized with a broad consensus. The organizing principles of the law are: you create regional governments based on historical departments, providing incentives for voluntary merger, clearly defined responsibilities, there is a neutrality and fiscal responsibility is gradually transferred services, no transparency in the process.

Local Governments
The local level, as stated in the constitution, are the provinces, districts and towns. These districts are administered by municipalities, consisting of a Mayor and City Council, which in turn directs the municipal companies.

Politics of Peru